Agim Nuhiu (born 1977) was Interior Minister of Macedonia. He was the first ethnic Albanian from Macedonia to hold this position in the government since Macedonia's independence from Yugoslavia in 1991. He was Deputy Minister in the Ministry of Internal Affairs for 4 years. On September 24th 2020, Agim Nuhiu became Deputy Minister of Justice in the Republic of North Macedonia.

References

People from Tetovo
1977 births
Living people